Sebastiano  Richiardi (26 February 1834, Lanzo – August 1904, Marina di Pisa) was an Italian anatomist and zoologist.
In 1861 he became Professor of Comparative Anatomy at the University of Bologna
and in 1871, held the same post at the University of Pisa. He was Rector Magnificus (principal) of the University of Pisa between 1891–93.

Publications

See External Links

Collections
The Richiardi collection of vertebrate osteology(together with his mounted specimens) and invertebrates is in Museo storia naturale di Pisa

External links
 University of Pisa Biography and publications list includes portrait.

Italian zoologists
Italian anatomists
1834 births
Academic staff of the University of Pisa
Academic staff of the University of Bologna
1904 deaths
People from Lanzo Torinese